Mandaphon is an extinct genus of procolophonid from the Middle Triassic Manda Formation of Tanzania. It contains a single species, Mandaphon nadra.

References 

Procolophonids
Prehistoric reptile genera